Zošto Sonot Ima Kraj is the second studio album by Macedonian pop singer, Karolina. The album was released in Macedonia and later in Serbia and Montenegro.

Track listings
"Ti Možeš"
"Se E Možno"
"Mojot Svet"
"I Ќe Bide Se Vo Red"
"Povtorno Vljubena"
"Kaži Mi"
"Jamajka"
"Konečno"
"Koga Ljubov Postoi"
"Dalečna Želba"
"Toj"

Bonus Tracks

"You Could"
"Looking For Jamaica"
"Tell Me"

Awards
Golden Lady Bug
 Concert Of The Year
 Music Video Of The Year
 Female Singer Of The Year
 Song Of The Year

TV Lice Na Godinata
 Singer Of The Year
 Album Of The Year
 Music Video Of The Year
 Concert Of The Year

Release history

Music contests
Karolina participated on the popular contest "Sunčane Skale" which takes place in Montenegro with the song "Kaži Mi". It was her first performance out of her native country, and she won the 3rd place.

Chart positions

Singles chart positions

2001 albums
Karolina Gočeva albums